Norman Madhoo (born April 9, 1964) is a former Guyanese professional darts player.

He is a three-time winner of the Caribbean and South American Masters, claiming the titles in 2003, 2009 and 2010.
Madhoo first qualified for the PDC World Darts Championship in 2004, losing in the first round to Steve Smith.

He qualified again in 2010, losing to Canada's Ken MacNeil by 4 legs to 2 in the preliminary round. He qualified for his third PDC World Championship in 2011, where he was beaten by South Africa's Devon Petersen by 4 legs to 3 in the preliminary round.

In 2012, Madhoo won the Florida Open by beating Don Carrico in the final.

World Championship Results

PDC
 2004: Last 48: (lost to Steve Smith 1–3) (sets)
 2010: Last 72: (lost to Ken MacNeil 2–4) (legs)
 2011: Last 72: (lost to Devon Petersen 3–4) (legs)

References

External links 
 
 Profile for Norman Madhoo

1964 births
Living people
Guyanese darts players
Professional Darts Corporation associate players